The 1963–64 Rheinlandliga was the 12th season of the highest amateur class of the Rhineland Football Association under the name of 1. Amateurliga Rheinland. It was a predecessor of today's Rheinlandliga.

Results
Rhineland champion was the relegation team from the previous season, Germania Metternich. Metternich also represented the South West in the German soccer amateur championship in 1964, but failed in the knock-out game with a 5–1 loss against the Berlin representative BFC Viktoria 1889.

The relegation to the second amateur league was SV Elkenroth, SSV Heimbach-Weis and the Sportfreunde Herdorf.

For the following season 1964–65, TuS Mosella Schweich, SG Altenkirchen and SC 07 Bad Neuenahr came up from the 2. Amateur League, as well as descendant from the II. Division, SV Niederlahnstein.

References

1964 in association football
Football in Rhineland-Palatinate
1963 in association football